La Chapelle-de-Mardore is a former commune in the Rhône department in Rhône-Alpes region in eastern France. Its population was 222 in 2019.

On 1 January 2013, La Chapelle-de-Mardore and four other communes merged becoming one commune called Thizy-les-Bourgs.

References

Former communes of Rhône (department)
Beaujolais (province)